The French submarine Joessel was a Joessel-class diesel-electric attack submarine built for the French Navy between 1913 and 1919. Joessel was built in the Arsenal de Cherbourg from 1913 to 1917, entered the French Marine Nationale in February 1920 and served until 1936.

Design
Joessel was ordered in the French fleet's 1914 program as part of a two ship class. During construction, though, the idea was abandoned and the ships were instead equipped with diesel engines.

The boat's complement was 47 men.

Joessel was armed with eight 450 mm torpedo tubes (four in the bow, two stern and two external trainable mounts), with a total of 10 torpedoes and two  guns.

Service
Joessel was built in the Arsenal de Cherbourg. She was laid down in November 1913, launched on 21 July 1917, and completed in February 1920. She received the pennant number Q 109.

Joessel was refitted during the 1920s when she received a new conning tower, bridge and two periscopes of 7.5 m (at the conning tower) and 9.5 m (at Headquarters).

Joessel served in the Atlantic until the early 1930s when she was transferred to Indochina. She was stricken in May 1936.

Notes

References

Citations 

World War I submarines of France
Joessel-class submarines
1917 ships